The 1993 European Figure Skating Championships was a senior-level international competition held in Helsinki, Finland from 12 to 17 January 1993. Elite skaters from European ISU member nations competed in the disciplines of men's singles, ladies' singles, pair skating, and ice dancing.

Results

Men

Ladies

Pairs

Ice dancing

References

External links
 https://web.archive.org/web/20081026042005/http://www.eskatefans.com/skatabase/euromen1990.html
 https://web.archive.org/web/20091128190759/http://www.eskatefans.com/skatabase/majors.html
 https://web.archive.org/web/20120317100920/http://www.eiskunstlauf-ecke.de/archiv/1992-93/em93.shtml
 NYT Report Pairs

European Figure Skating Championships, 1993
European Figure Skating Championships, 1993
European Figure Skating Championships
International figure skating competitions hosted by Finland
International sports competitions in Helsinki
1990s in Helsinki
January 1993 sports events in Europe